Abi Taviner (born 20 February 1990) is a Welsh rugby union player who has played centre wing for Ospreys Women's and the Wales women's national rugby union team. She won her first international cap in 2011, in a match against New Zealand at the 2010 Women's Rugby World Cup, and her first international try came against Ireland the following year.

Biography
Taviner's birth was on 20 February 1990 in Neath, Neath Port Talbot, Wales. Outside of rugby, Taviner works as a lifeguard at Village Urban Resorts Swansea, and also plays badminton and table tennis.

She began playing rugby when she was a 14-year-old student at Llangatwg School in Aberdulais, and has played the sport for the West Wales, Welsh Students, Wales Sevens and various national teams. Taviner played for the Wales national under-20 rugby union team and she captained the nation to victory over England during the 2009–2010 campaign. At the 2010 Women's Rugby World Cup in London, she got her first international cap for the Wales women's national team in a match against New Zealand and went on to play in multiple Women's Six Nations Championship campaigns, as well as the 2014 Women's Rugby World Cup held in France in a surprise recall to the national side. She won 25 international caps before turning 26 years old, one of which was against the UK Armed Forces at the Cardiff Arms Park on 11 November 2015.

Taviner scored her first career international try in a match against Ireland at Pandy Park in 2011. At club level, she has played for Neath Athletic, Skewen RFC and captained the Ospreys Women's team.

References

1990 births
Living people
Rugby union players from Neath
20th-century Welsh women
21st-century Welsh women
Welsh female rugby union players
Wales international rugby union players
Rugby union centres
Rugby union fullbacks
Ospreys (rugby union) players